John Laney (died 1633), of Cratfield and Ipswich, Suffolk, was an English politician.

He was a Member of Parliament (MP) for Ipswich in 1586.

References

16th-century births
1633 deaths
Members of the Parliament of England (pre-1707) for Ipswich
English MPs 1586–1587